The 1895 New Hampshire football team was an American football team that represented New Hampshire College of Agriculture and the Mechanic Arts during the 1895 college football season—the school became the University of New Hampshire in 1923. The team played a six-game schedule without facing any other college teams, and finished with a record of 1–4–1 or 2–3–1, per 1895 sources or modern sources, respectively.

At the close of the 1894 season, the team had selected William C. Dudley to again captain the 1895 squad. However, with Dudley and seven other members of the team having left college, Everett S. Whittemore became captain of the 1895 squad, until he resigned the position mid-season and was replaced by Fred F. Hayes.

Schedule
Scoring during this era awarded 4 points for a touchdown, 2 points for a conversion kick (extra point), and 5 points for a field goal. Teams played in the one-platoon system and the forward pass was not yet legal. Games were played in two halves rather than four quarters.

A report in The New Hampshire College Monthly by the team's student manager stated that the team played six games, Recaps of seven games were provided in the College Monthly; six varsity contests plus a game played by the second team (backups). On November 2, the varsity defeated Somersworth High School while the second team defeated Berwick Academy. College Football Data Warehouse and the Wildcats' media guide list both of those contests, while omitting the October 12 loss against the Portsmouth Athletic Association. While the student manager's report noted that the "Portsmouth game was postponed three times", the College Monthly is clear that the game did get played; thus it is included in the overall record per 1895 sources, in lieu of the second team's win over Berwick Academy.

Roster

Source:

Notes

References

New Hampshire
New Hampshire Wildcats football seasons
New Hampshire football